Héctor Santos Llorente (born 6 January 1998) is a Spanish athlete specialising in the long jump. He represented his country at the 2019 World Championships in Doha without qualifying for the final. Earlier that year he won a silver medal at the 2019 European U23 Championships.

His personal bests in the event are 8.19 metres outdoors (-0.1 m/s, Gävle 2019) and 7.93 metres indoors (Antequera 2019).

He lives in Guadalajara where he trains in the group of former jumper Iván Pedroso.

International competitions

References

1998 births
Living people
Spanish male long jumpers
World Athletics Championships athletes for Spain
Athletes (track and field) at the 2018 Mediterranean Games
Athletes from Madrid
Mediterranean Games competitors for Spain